Mauwia is an association football club from Vanuatu that plays in the Port Vila First Division of the Port Vila Football League.

History
In 2016 Mauwia won the 2016 PVFA First Division and gained promotion to the Port Vila Premier League for the first time in the club's history.

Notes

Facebook page - https://web.facebook.com/mauwiafc

Football clubs in Vanuatu